Festival in Cannes is a 2001 film directed by Henry Jaglom.

The plot is an entertainment industry farce about filmmakers trying to make deals during the 1999 Cannes Film Festival.

Plot summary
Cannes, 1999. Alice, an actress, wants to direct an indie picture. Kaz, a talkative (and maybe bogus) deal maker, promises $3 million if she'll use Millie, an aging French star. But, Rick, a big producer, needs Millie for a small part in a fall movie or he loses his star, Tom Hanks. Is Kaz for real? Can Rick sweet-talk Alice and sabotage Kaz to keep Millie from taking that deal? Millie consults with Victor, her ex, about which picture to make, Rick needs money, an ingenue named Blue is discovered, Kaz hits on Victor's new love, and Rick's factotum connects with Blue. Knives go in various backs. Wheels spin. Which deals - and pairings - will be consummated?

In Cannes, actress Alice Palmer wants to have her debut in the cinema industry as director and her two friends have written a screenplay for Gena Rowlands. However they are approached by the counterfeit crasher Kaz Naiman who convinces them to rewrite the scrip for the famous French actress Millie Marquand currently at the festival. In return he will sponsor the feature with three million dollars. Millie loves the screenplay and promises to make the film. However, the powerful producer Rick Yorkin is producing a blockbuster with Tom Hanks and Simone Duvall and needs Millie Marquand to perform the role of Tom Hanks' mother. Millie's former husband, the director Viktor Kovner is in Cannes and Rick manipulates him to convince Millie to accept the part. Meanwhile, the promising debutant star Blue becomes a hit in the festival but is divided between her lover and her career.

Cast
Anouk Aimée – Millie Marquand
Greta Scacchi – Alice Palmer
Maximilian Schell – Viktor Kovner
Ron Silver – Rick Yorkin
Jenny Gabrielle – Blue
Zack Norman – Kaz Naiman
Peter Bogdanovich – Milo

Cameos:
Faye Dunaway
Jeff Goldblum
Holly Hunter
William Shatner

External links

2001 films
2001 comedy films
Films directed by Henry Jaglom
American comedy films
Films set in 1999
Films set in Cannes
Films about film directors and producers
2000s English-language films
2000s American films